Isaac Yiadom (born February 20, 1996) is an American football cornerback for the New Orleans Saints of the National Football League (NFL). A graduate of Doherty Memorial High School in Worcester, Massachusetts, he played college football at Boston College.

College career
After high school, Yiadom signed with Boston College over offers from Bryant, Holy Cross, and Connecticut.  After his senior year, Yiadom was invited to the 2018 Senior Bowl.  Boston College teammates Harold Landry and Kamrin Moore were also invited, making it the first time since 2006 that 3 players from Boston College were invited to the senior bowl.

Professional career
On December 18, 2017, it was announced that Yiadom had accepted his invitation to play in the 2018 Senior Bowl. Prior to the Senior Bowl, Yiadom was ranked as the 47th best cornerback prospect in the by DraftScout.com and was unheralded due to his minimal targets in college. He impressed scouts and analysts with a strong week of practice for the Senior Bowl and immensely helped his draft stock. On January 27, 2018, Yiadom played in the 2018 Reese's Senior Bowl and was part of Denver Broncos' head coach Vance Joseph's South team that lost 45–16 to the North coach by Houston Texans' head coach Bill O'Brien. He attended the NFL Scouting Combine in Indianapolis and performed the majority of combine drills, but opted to skip the vertical jump and three-cone drill. 

On March 21, 2018, Yiadom participated at Boston College's pro day and chose to perform the 40-yard dash (4.56s), 20-yard dash (2.63s), 10-yard dash (1.53s), vertical jump (34.5"), broad jump (10'0"), short shuttle (4.23s), and three-cone drill (6.85s). At the conclusion of the pre-draft process, Yiadom was projected to be a third or fourth round pick by NFL draft experts and scouts. He was ranked the 12th best cornerback prospect in the draft by DraftScout.com and was ranked the 15th best cornerback by Scouts Inc.

Denver Broncos
The Denver Broncos selected Yiadom in the third round (99th overall) of the 2018 NFL Draft. Yiadom was the 11th cornerback drafted in 2018.

On May 25, 2018, the Broncos signed Yiadom to a four-year, $3.32 million contract that included a signing bonus of $761,516.

New York Giants
Yiadom was traded to the New York Giants for a 2021 seventh-round draft pick on September 3, 2020.  Yiadom started 10 games for the Giants in his one season with them.

Green Bay Packers
Yiadom was traded to the Green Bay Packers for cornerback Josh Jackson on August 17, 2021. Yiadom started for the Packers on Week 6 against the Chicago Bears following injuries to starting cornerbacks Kevin King and Jaire Alexander. He committed a pass interference penalty on the opponent's opening drive to set up a Bears touchdown. Yiadom was subsequently benched for backup cornerback Rasul Douglas, who won the starting cornerback job with his steadier performance, and Yiadom being relegated to a backup and special teams role. On November 3, 2021, he was placed on reserve/COVID-19 list. He was activated off reserve/COVID-19 list on November 13, 2021. On January 21, 2022, he was released along with Jack Heflin to open roster spaces for the returns of Za'Darius Smith and Whitney Mercilus from injured reserve prior to the divisional playoff game.

Houston Texans
On March 24, 2022, Yiadom signed with the Houston Texans. He was waived on November 15, 2022.

New Orleans Saints
On November 17, 2022, Yiadom was signed to the New Orleans Saints practice squad. He was promoted to the active roster on December 5.

NFL career statistics

Regular season

Personal life
Yiadom is the son of Ghanaian immigrants.

References

External links
Houston Texans bio
Boston College Eagles bio

1996 births
Living people
African-American players of American football
Players of American football from Worcester, Massachusetts
American football cornerbacks
Boston College Eagles football players
Denver Broncos players
American sportspeople of Ghanaian descent
New York Giants players
Green Bay Packers players
21st-century African-American sportspeople
Houston Texans players
Doherty Memorial High School alumni
New Orleans Saints players